The Corsair Cruze 970, also called the Corsair 970, is a Vietnamese trailerable sailboat that was designed by the Corsair Design Team as a cruiser and first built in 2012. The boat is a development of the Corsair 31.

Production
The design has been built by Corsair Marine in Vietnam since 2012 and remains in production.

Design

The design is based on the Corsair 31, which was in turn based on the Farrier F-31. The designer, Ian Farrier, had sold the rights to the F-31 to Corsair in 2000.

The Corsair Cruze 970 is a recreational trimaran, built predominantly of fiberglass over a PVC core. It has a fractional sloop rig with a rotating airfoil mast and a bowsprit. the hull and outriggers have plumb stems and transoms. The main hull has a kick-up, transom-hung rudder controlled by a tiller and a retractable daggerboard. It displaces  and carries no ballast.

The boat is normally fitted with a small outboard motor for docking and maneuvering. The recommended engine is a  Yamaha Corporation four stroke, high thrust, extra long shaft.

The design has sleeping accommodation for four people, with a double "V"-berth in the bow cabin and an aft cabin with a double berth. The galley is located on the starboard side just forward of the companionway ladder. The galley is equipped with a two-burner stove and a sink. The head is located just aft of the bow cabin on both sides.

Operational history
Naval architect Robert Perry wrote in a 2013  for Sailing magazine, "I don't think you would spend much time under power in this tri. The SA/D is 36.47, and that's a lot of sail power per pound, easily enough to give you very good light air boat speed. The mast is a rotating wing. A carbon fiber bowsprit allows you to fly either a 448-square-foot screecher or an 893-square-foot chute. That is enough off-the-wind sail area to provide for some very exciting sailing. For some comparison, the 893-square-foot spinnaker is bigger than the entire rig of the Cal 40."

In a 2014 review for Cruising World, Tim Murphy wrote that the "970 features much thinner, higher-aspect-ratio foils that are optimized for speeds in the teens and higher. (A note to those who haven't sailed Corsairs before: Those boat speeds are real. Try it!) ... We sailed the 970 in light air. With the screacher up in 8 to 10 knots of breeze, we posted 6.6 knots just above 60 degrees apparent, then cracked off and made 7.6 knots."

See also
List of sailing boat types

References

External links

Trimarans
2010s sailboat type designs
Sailing yachts
Trailer sailers
Sailboat type designs by Corsair Design Team
Sailboat types built by Corsair Marine